VADS Berhad was formed in 1991 as a joint venture between Telekom Malaysia and IBM to take advantage of the convergence of IT and Telecommunications Industry. The company officially started operations the following year. Two other partners joined in the venture in 1993 and 1995, namely Permodalan Nasional Berhad (PNB) and The Employees Provident Fund (EPF) respectively.

Its main activities are Managed Networks Services, Contact Center Services and Systems Integration Services.

VADS was listed on the Kuala Lumpur Stock Exchange on 7 August 2002 — making it the first Telekom Malaysia Berhad (Telekom Malaysia) subsidiary to be listed.  VADS is a member of the TM group of companies.

References

External links
VADS Official Website
VADS Berhad (MYX: 7150), bursamalaysia.com
Company Overview of VADS Berhad, bloomberg.com

1990 establishments in Malaysia
TM Group of Companies
Business process outsourcing companies
Technology companies established in 1990
Malaysian companies established in 1990
Companies formerly listed on Bursa Malaysia
Privately held companies of Malaysia